Rapmasters: From Tha Priority Vaults, Vol. 8 is the eighth and final volume in the Rapmasters budget compilation series that Priority Records released throughout 1996 and 1997. As usual, there is no fully uncut explicit version of this volume available meaning that all songs appear here in their censored versions. This volume is the shortest-running volume of the entire series.

Track listing
 Appetite For Destruction (N.W.A)
 Place To Be (Heltah Skeltah)
 The Predator (Ice Cube)
 I Must Stand (Ice-T)
 Datz Real Gangsta (Brotha Lynch Hung)
 Southern Girl (Lil 1/2 Dead)
 She's So Tight (The Conscious Daughters)
 6 Figures and Up (The B.U.M.S)
 Learnin' The Game (Me & My Cousin)

References

1997 compilation albums
Priority Records compilation albums
Gangsta rap compilation albums
Hip hop compilation albums
Record label compilation albums